Kyusyur is a rural locality (a selo), the only inhabited locality, and the administrative center of Bulunsky Rural Okrug of the Bulunsky District in the Sakha Republic, Russia, located  from Tiksi, the administrative center of the district. Its population as of the 2010 Census was 1,345; up from 1,336 recorded in the 2002 Census.

Geography
Kyusyur is located by the right bank of the Lena, a few miles south of the mouth of the Eyekit.

Climate
Kyusyur has an extremely continental subarctic climate (Dfc, bordering on Dfd) with extremely cold, long winters and very mild, very short summers.

References

Notes

Sources
Official website of the Sakha Republic. Registry of the Administrative-Territorial Divisions of the Sakha Republic. Bulunsky District. 

Rural localities in Bulunsky District
Road-inaccessible communities of the Sakha Republic
